The bid–ask matrix is a matrix with elements corresponding with exchange rates between the assets.  These rates are in physical units (e.g. number of stocks) and not with respect to any numeraire.  The  element of the matrix is the number of units of asset  which can be exchanged for 1 unit of asset .

Mathematical definition
A  matrix  is a bid-ask matrix, if
Any trade has a positive exchange rate.
Can always trade 1 unit with itself.
A direct exchange is always at most as expensive as a chain of exchanges.

Example
Assume a market with 2 assets (A and B), such that  units of A can be exchanged for 1 unit of B, and  units of B can be exchanged for 1 unit of A.  Then the bid–ask matrix  is:

 

It is required that  by rule .

The bid–ask matrix is:

 

Rule  applies the following inequalities:

 
 
 

 
 

 
 

 
 

Relation to solvency cone
Then the solvency cone  is the convex cone spanned by the unit vectors  and the vectors .

Similarly given a (constant) solvency cone it is possible to extract the bid–ask matrix from the bounding vectors.

Notes
 If  then that pair is frictionless.

References

Mathematical finance